Afroamphica is a genus of flowering plants belonging to the family Fabaceae.

Its native range is Tropical Africa.

Species:

Afroamphica africana

References

Fabaceae
Fabaceae genera